Dava (Latinate plural davae) was a Geto-Dacian name for a city, town or fortress. Generally, the name indicated a tribal center or an important settlement, usually fortified. Some of the Dacian settlements and the fortresses employed the Murus Dacicus traditional construction technique.

Most of these towns are attested by Ptolemy, and therefore date from at least the 1st century CE. 

The "dava" towns can be found as south as Sandanski and Plovdiv. Strabo specified that the Daci are the Getae. The Dacians, Getae and their kings were always considered as Thracians by the ancients (Dio Cassius, Trogus Pompeius, Appian, Strabo, Herodotus and Pliny the Elder), and were both said to speak the same Thracian language.

Etymology 
Many city names of the Dacians were composed of an initial lexical element (often the tribe name) affixed to -dava, -daua, -deva, -deba, -daba or -dova (<PIE *dʰeh₁-, "to set, place"). Therefore, dava 'town' derived from the reconstructed proto-Indo-European *dhewa 'settlement'. A pre-Indo-European origin for the Dacian term is also suggested, e.g., see comparison with Kartvelian *daba, 'town, village'.

List of davae 
Below is a list of Dacian towns which include various forms of dava in their name:

 Acidava (Acidaua), a fortress town close to the Danube. Located in today's Enoșești, Olt County, Romania
 Aedava (Aedeva, Aedabe, Aedeba or Aedadeba), placed by Procopius on the Danubian road between Augustae and Variana, in Moesia (the present Northern Bulgaria)
 Aiadava (Aiadaba or Aeadaba), was a locality in the Remesiana region, present Bela Palanka, Serbia.
 Argedava (Argedauon, Sargedava, Sargedauon, Zargedava, Zargedauon), mentioned in the Decree of Dionysopolis, potentially the dava discovered at Popești, a district in the town of Mihăilești, Giurgiu County, Romania and maybe Burebista's court/capital
 Argidava (Argidaua, Arcidava, Arcidaua, Argedava, Argedauon, Sargedava, Sargedauon, Zargedava, Zargedauon), potentially Burebista's court/capital, located in today's Vărădia, Caraș-Severin County, Romania
 Bregedaba
 Buricodava
 Buridava or Burridava, today's Ocnele Mari, Romania
 Buteridava
 Capidava or Kapidaua, a fortress town on the southern side of the lower Danube
 Carsidava or Karsidaua
 Cumidava, Comidava or Komidaua, ancient Râșnov, Romania
 Dausdava, Dausadava or Dausdavua, "The shrine of wolves", a fortress town close to the Danube
 Desudaba
 Docidava or Dokidaua
 Gildova or Gildoba, located alongside the Vistula river
 Giridava
 Itadeba or Itadava, in north eastern North Macedonia
 Jidava, near  Câmpulung Muscel, Romania
 Jidova
 Klepidaua
 Kuimedaba
 Marcodava or Markodaua
 Murideba
 Nentinava or Netindaua, ancient Slobozia, Romania
 Nentivava, ancient Oltenița, Romania
 Patridava or Patridaua
 Pelendava or Pelendova, ancient Craiova, Romania
 Perburidava
 Petrodava or Petrodaua located in Piatra Neamţ
 Piroboridava or Piroboridaua
 Pulpudeva, originally named Eumolpias by the Dacians. Philip II of Macedon conquered the area in 342–341 BC and renamed the city Philippoupolis, of which the later Dacian name for the city, Pulpu-deva, is a reconstructed translation. Today's city of Plovdiv in Bulgaria.
 Quemedava, mentioned by Procopius in Dardania
 Ramidava or Rhamidaua
 Recidava
 Rusidava or Rusidava
 Sacidava or Sacidaba
 Sagadava
 Sandava
 Sangidaua
 Scaidava or Skedeba
 Setidava or Setidaua, mentioned by Ptolemy as a thriving settlement
 Singidava or Singidaua
 Sucidava, Suvidava or Sukidaua located in Corabia, Olt County, Romania
 Susudava, mentioned by Ptolemy as a thriving settlement
 Sykidaba
 Tamasidava or Tamasidaua
 Thermidava, placed by Ptolemy on the Lissus-Naissus route. The toponym is most probably a misreading of a settlement which most scholars in contemporary research locate near present-day Banat, Serbia.
 Utidava or Utidaua
 Zargidava or Zargidaua
 Ziridava or Ziridaua
 Zisnedeva, Zisnudeva or Zisnudeba, located in Dacian Moesia
 Zucidaua
 Zisnudeba
 Zusidava

See also 
 List of ancient cities in Thrace and Dacia
 Dacian language
 Dacia
 Polis
 Deva

References

Citations

Bibliography

External links 

 Dacian Davae in Enciclopedia Dacica (Romanian)
 Dacian materials and construction techniques in Enciclopedia Dacica (Romanian)
 Sorin Olteanu's Project: Linguae Thraco-Daco-Moesorum – Toponyms Section (Romanian, partially English)
 Lists of Dacian fortresses, towns and citadels 

Dacian towns
Dacian language